Acritodon nephophilus is a species of moss in the family Sematophyllaceae. It is endemic to Mexico, where it is known only from two locations in the Sierra Madre de Oaxaca of Oaxaca state. Its natural habitat is subtropical or tropical moist lowland forests. It is threatened by habitat loss. Conservation efforts for this species have difficulty protecting local populations due to insufficient attention and legislation regarding preservation of moss species.

References

Hypnaceae
Endemic flora of Mexico
Flora of Oaxaca
Endangered biota of Mexico
Endangered plants
Taxonomy articles created by Polbot
Flora of the Sierra Madre de Oaxaca